Boris Dvornik (16 April 1939 – 24 March 2008) was a Croatian actor.

Biography 
Born in Split to the family of a carpenter, Dvornik discovered acting talent at an early age, while performing in children's plays. After studying to become an electrician, he began to pursue a full-time acting career. He studied at the National Acting School in Novi Sad and later enrolled at the Academy of Dramatic Art at the University of Zagreb.

As a freshman, he was cast in the starring role of the 1960 Holocaust drama The Ninth Circle. A year later, he showed his versatility by appearing in the popular comedy Martin in the Clouds. This established Dvornik as a big star of former Yugoslav cinema, comparable to Ljubiša Samardžić, Milena Dravić and Bata Živojinović; with latter he later developed a close friendship. 

The zenith of Dvornik's popularity came in the 1970s with the role of Roko Prč in the cult series Naše malo misto. In the 1980s, after receiving acclaim as of one of the most renowned and prolific actors of the former Yugoslavia, Dvornik mostly worked with the Croatian National Theatre in his native city of Split.

Over the years Dvornik developed a close friendship with Antun Vrdoljak. He talked him into getting involved in politics and in the 1992 parliamentary election, Dvornik, as candidate of Croatian Democratic Union, was elected in the Split constituency. He soon realized that he had not the taste for politics and resigned his seat one month later. In more recent years, his career was affected by aftermath of a stroke and alcohol abuse, which manifested in a series of incidents, the most notorious being assault on a poll observer during the 2005 presidential election.

Dvornik had two sons, Dean and Dino, with his wife Diana Tomić, whom he married in 1962. Their younger son Dino died five and a half months after Boris. 

Boris Dvornik suffered a stroke and died in Split on 24 March 2008. He was 68. He was buried three days later at Lovrinac Cemetery in his hometown.

Selected filmography
Source:

 
 The Ninth Circle (1960) – Ivo Vojnović
 Martin in the Clouds (1961) – Martin Barić
 Medaljon sa tri srca (1962) 
 Da li je umro dobar čovjek? (1962) – Miki
 Sjenka slave (1962) – Bazi
 Prekobrojna (1962) – Dane
 Double Circle (1963) – Krile
 Radopolje (1963) – Man without a nail
 Face to Face (1963) – Andrija Mackic
 Zemljaci (1963) – Nikola
 Lito vilovito (1964) – Ive
 Among Vultures (1964) – Fred
 Svanuce (1964) – Assistant chauffeur Stevo
 Man Is Not a Bird (1965) – Truckdriver 
 Čovik od svita (1965) – Ive
 Konjuh planinom (1966) – Meso
 Winnetou and Old Firehand (1966) – Pater
 Kaja, ubit ću te! (1967)
 When You Hear the Bells (1969) – Kubura
 The Bridge (1969) – Zavatoni
 Događaj (1969) – Gamekeeper 
 Battle of Neretva (1969) – Stipe
 Ljubav i poneka psovka (1969) – Mate Pivac
 Bablje ljeto (1970) – Captain
 Život je masovna pojava (1970) – Adio
 Družba Pere Kvržice (1970) – Jozo policeman
 The Pine Tree in the Mountain (1971) – Dikan
 Opklada (1971) – Truckdriver
 Lov na jelene (1972) – Barman Zeljo
 Traces of a Black Haired Girl (1972) – Jova
 To Live on Love (1973) – Medan
 The Battle of Sutjeska (1973) – Dalmatinac
 Derviš i smrt (1974) – Hasan Dželebdžija 
 Crveni udar (1974) – Captain of aviation 
 Hitler iz našeg sokaka (1975) – Marko
 Hajdučka vremena (1977) – Dane Desnica
 Letači velikog neba (1977) – Tomo
 Occupation in 26 Pictures (1978) – Vlaho
 Povratak (1979) – Barba Frane
 Vreme, vodi (1980) – Narednik Žika
 Cyclops (1982) – Major of the Yugoslav Army
 Servantes iz Malog Mista (1982) – Roko Prč
 Moj tata na određeno vreme (1982) – Bora
 Pismo - Glava (1983) – Bajo's brother
 The Secret of an Old Attic (1984) – Šime
 Horvatov izbor (1985)
 Od petka do petka (1985)
 Marjuča ili smrt (1987) – Ivanko
 Tempi di guerra (1987) – Bronco - Rebel Leader
 Tesna koža 2 (1987) – Vujo
 Špijun na štiklama (1988) – Bozur
 Karneval, anđeo i prah (1990) – Visko (segment "Karneval")
 Tajna starog mlina (1991)
 Nausikaya (1995)
 Transatlantic (1998)
 Kanjon opasnih igara (1998) – Frane

 The Last Will (2001) – Jure
 The Doctor of Craziness (2003) – Prolaznik
 Long Dark Night (2004) – Luka Kolar

References

External links

1939 births
2008 deaths
Actors from Split, Croatia
Croatian male film actors
Croatian male stage actors
Croatian male television actors
Vladimir Nazor Award winners
Golden Arena winners
Indexi Award winners
Burials at Lovrinac Cemetery